A Lullaby to the Sorrowful Mystery is a 2016 historical fantasy drama film directed by Lav Diaz. It was selected to compete for the Golden Bear at the 66th Berlin International Film Festival. At the film festival, it won the Alfred Bauer Prize (Silver Bear, 2nd Prize). The film was released on 26 March and was distributed by Star Cinema.

Cast
 John Lloyd Cruz as Isagani
 Piolo Pascual as Simoun / Crisostomo Ibarra
 Hazel Orencio as Gregoria 'Oryang' De Jesus
 Alessandra De Rossi as Ceasaria Belarmino
 Susan Africa as Aling Hule
 Joel Saracho as Mang Karyo
 Bernardo Bernardo as Lalake / Tikbalang
 Cherie Gil as Babae / Tikbalang
 Angel Aquino as Androgynous / Tikbalang
 Sid Lucero as Basilio
 Ely Buendia as Musikero
 Bart Guingona as Kapitan Heneral
 Kuya Manzano as Padre Camorra
 Menggie Cobarrubias as Padre Florentino
 Ronnie Lazaro as Sebastian Caneo

Reception
The film received mixed reviews from critics, with criticism mostly directed towards its pacing and confusing narrative. Guy Lodge of Variety states in his review that "A major disappointment from a major filmmaker, Diaz's latest super-sized tapestry of historical fact, folklore and cine-poetry is typically ambitious in its expressionism—but sees the helmer venturing into the kind of declamatory, didactic rhetoric that his recent stunners Norte, the End of History and From What Is Before so elegantly avoided." Part of the Berlinale Jury citation, headed by Meryl Streep:"...for opening new perspectives in cinema." Screen Daily calls it as "...one of Lav Diaz's best works." 

The scholar Noel Vera says:"Ah no--no. Hele sa Hiwagang Hapis is a gorgeous film that traces the outlines of the Philippine character, flaws and virtues and all, from the ferment of an end-of-the-century rebellion through four hundred years of colonial past down to ancient pagan roots. If every foreign critic hated it for its many flawed details (forgot to mention, some of the Spanish sounded stilted), its dialogue-heavy dramaturgy, its (ultimately irrelevant) length, none of this would matter. The film was made for us Filipinos, to fill our hunger for poetry and narrative and magic, to give us back a sense of our storied past, our mythical and historical dead." 
The Italian critic Giampiero Raganelli cites:"Eight hours of mesmeric black and white, eight hours of beauty." 

“This expansive and richly detailed story is to the screen what ‘War and Peace’ is to literature. Tracing various character paths and threads throughout the Philippine Revolution of 1896-97, the embroidery on display through calculated measures that redefine patience weave urban legends, local traditions, real-life artistic expressions with the most sensitive chapter of Philippine history.” —Nikola Grozdanovic, Indiewire

“An ambitious statement by one of contemporary cinema’s authentic radicals.”
— Screen Daily

“Certainly one of Diaz’s finest films.”
— Cinema Scope

References

External links
 

2016 films
2016 drama films
Philippine drama films
Philippine black-and-white films
2010s Tagalog-language films
Philippine independent films
Films directed by Lav Diaz
Star Cinema films
2016 independent films